Samuel Alfredo Morris de Olea (1870 - 23 August 1935), was an Anglo-Filipino football pioneer who played as a goalkeeper for some of the earliest Catalan clubs in existence. His younger brothers, Enrique and Miguel, followed him every step through, and together with them, he was one of the first pioneers of football in Catalonia, playing for several experimental teams in the 1890s such as Barcelona Football Club and Sociedad de Foot-Ball de Barcelona.

Samuel was a member of the Hispania AC side that won the 1900–01 Copa Macaya, which was the very first football competition played on the Iberian Peninsula. In addition to being a footballer, he also practiced cricket, athletics, cycling, rugby, tennis, and hockey, and was also an outstanding football referee.

Playing career

Early years
Samuel was born in the Philippines to an English father (James Morris) and a Basque mother. In 1886 the family moved to Barcelona, where his father had been transferred to run the Barcelona Tramways Company Limited. On the grounds near the Hippodrome of Can Tunis, their father taught his three sons Samuel, Enrique (Henry) and Miguel (Júnior) the practice of football, a sport that was practically unknown in the city at the time. Together with his brother, Enrique, he was one of the first pioneers of football in Catalonia, being part of the first known club to have played football in the city, the Barcelona Cricket Club (founded in 1891 by Britons), since they played cricket in the summer and then football in the winter (which was common at the time).

Barcelona Football Club

In 1892, the Morris brothers meet James Reeves, who approached the club's members to propose them the idea of creating a well-organized football club, and the Morris were among the first to join him, as they were also in love with the game. The Morris were crucial for Reeves to succeed in finding enough people to assemble two teams as they were Reeves' highest promoters of football in the city, thus playing a vital role in the formation of the Barcelona Football Club in late 1892, and together with Reeves, they were crucial in its success.

This entity held the first known football match in the city, which was held at Hippodrome of Can Tunis on 25 December 1892. It remains unclear if they actually played in this match or not, but they surely played on 12 March 1893, in the historic match between a blue team and a red team, and interestingly, the brothers were on opposite teams, with Enrique playing for the Blues as a forward while Samuel represented the reds as a goalkeeper in a 1–2 loss, but at least he kept his brother at bay as the two goals he conceded came from Catalans (Figueras and Barrié). Together with their younger brother, Miguel, the three of them appeared in what is regarded to be the oldest photograph of a football team in Spain, which was these two sides before the match on 12 March, with Miguel being only a 13-year-old at the time.

Sociedad de Foot-Ball de Barcelona
Samuel played several training matches at Can Tunis and a few others at Bonanova between 1892 and 1896, the last of which for the Sociedad de Foot-Ball de Barcelona, standing out as a great goalkeeper. He played in training matches (Blues vs Reds) and against a team from Sant Martí and another from Torelló, the Torelló Foot-ball Association, the latter of which marked the first time that teams from two different cities played against each other in Catalonia.

Hispania AC
From 1899 onwards numerous teams appeared in the city, including Wild and Gamper's FC Barcelona, Vila's Català FC, Team Anglès, Sociedad Española and Hispania AC, with the Morris joining the latter in 1900. Together with John Parsons and captain Gustavo Green, the Morris helped Hispania AC win the very first football competition played on the Iberian Peninsula, the 1900–01 Copa Macaya, with Samuel and Enrique, in particular, playing a pivotal role in helping Hispania become the very first Spanish club to win an official title, Enrique as a forward and Samuel as a goalkeeper. In the decisive game against Barcelona on 14 April 1901, Hispania only needed a draw to win the title, and it was largely thanks to Samuel that they managed to resist Barça's intense siege in an eventual 1–1 draw.

FC Barcelona
In 1902, the three Morris brothers reinforced FC Barcelona during its participation in the Copa de la Coronación (predecessor of Copa del Rey), playing two official matches for them: The semi-finals against Real Madrid CF (then Madrid FC), which was the very first El Clásico, and the final, where Barça was defeated 2–1 by Club Vizcaya (a combination of players from Athletic Club and Bilbao Football Club).

After this parenthesis with Barça, the Morris brothers continued to play at Hispania AC until 1903, when the club was dissolved for lack of players, but while Enrique and Miguel then join FC Barcelona on a permanent basis, Samuel decided to retire due to his already advanced age.

Personal life
He married Antonia Montero in Barcelona in 1896, they were the parents of Elena Antonia, Samuel Ernesto (1900–1974), Enrique Reginaldo (1902–1964) and Edgar. He always lived in Barcelona and remained linked to football. He died on 23 August 1935 at the age of 65.

Honours
Hispania AC
 Copa Macaya:
 Champion: 1900–01
 Runner-up: 1901–02

Barcelona
 Copa de la Coronación: 
 Runner-up: 1902

References

1870 births
1935 deaths
Spanish people of English descent
Spanish people of Basque descent
Sportspeople from Manila
Footballers from Barcelona
Filipino footballers
Spanish footballers
Association football goalkeepers
FC Barcelona players
Spanish referees and umpires